Hu Ting (born 12 February 1981) is a former Chinese badminton player. Born in Hubei, Hu was joined the provincial team in 1994. She then selected to join the national junior team in 1997, after that in the senior team in 1998. Hu was two times Asian Junior Champion in 1998 and 1999, also the runner-up in 1998 World Junior Championships. She won the senior title at the 2002 Malaysia Open, defeating the World No.1 women's singles player Camilla Martin.

Achievements

World Junior Championships 
Girls' singles

Asian Junior Championships 
Girls' singles

IBF World Grand Prix
The World Badminton Grand Prix sanctioned by International Badminton Federation (IBF) since 1983.

Women's singles

References

External links
 

1981 births
Living people
Badminton players from Hubei
Chinese female badminton players